Colm McGurk (1967 – 12 July 2022) was a dual player of Gaelic games, i.e. hurling and Gaelic football, who played both sports for the Lavey club, as well as for both Derry senior teams. McGurk also served as a coach and manager at various levels.

Playing career
One of 13 children, McGurk first played Gaelic football and hurling at juvenile and underage levels with Lavey. He won consecutive MacRory Cup titles lining out as a schoolboy with St Patrick's College, Maghera before winning a Sigerson Cup title as a student at Queen's University Belfast. McGurk progressed onto the Lavey senior teams in both codes and was corner-forward on the team that won the All-Ireland SCFC title in 1991. His lengthy club career also yielded 16 titles at county level across both codes. At inter-county level, McGurk followed his brothers, Hugh Martin, Anthony and Johnny, onto the Derry team and won Ulster U21 titles in both codes in 1986 before spending much of his senior career as a dual player. He was a member of the extended panel when Derry beat Cork in the 1993 All-Ireland SFC final. His other inter-county honours include three National Football League titles and Ulster Championship titles in both codes.

Management career
In retirement from playing, McGurk filled a number of coaching and management roles at club and inter-county levels. He was manager of the Derry senior hurling team for two years and guided them to the 2017 Nicky Rackard Cup title.

Death
McGurk died on 12 July 2022, aged 55.

Honours

Player
St Patrick's College
MacRory Cup: 1984, 1985

Queen's University Belfast
Sigerson Cup: 1990

Lavey
All-Ireland Senior Club Football Championship: 1991
Ulster Senior Club Football Championship: 1990, 1992
Derry Senior Football Championship: 1988, 1990, 1992, 1993
Derry Senior Hurling Championship: 1985, 1986, 1988, 1990, 1991, 1992, 1994, 1995, 1997, 1999, 2001, 2002

Derry
All-Ireland Senior Football Championship: 1993
Ulster Senior Football Championship: 1993
Ulster Senior Hurling Championship: 2000
National Hurling League Division 2: 2000
National Football League Division 1: 1991–92, 1994–95, 1995–96
Ulster Under-21 Football Championship: 1986
Ulster Under-21 Hurling Championship: 1986

Manager
Derry
Nicky Rackard Cup: 2017
Ulster Under-21 Hurling Championship: 2017

References

1967 births
2022 deaths
Derry inter-county Gaelic footballers
Dual players
Lavey Gaelic footballers
Lavey hurlers